Rurrenabaque Airport  is an airport serving Rurrenabaque, a port city on the Beni River in the Beni Department of Bolivia.

Runway 14/32 was asphalted in 2010. Before, because of the grass runways, no flights could land or takeoff on a rainy day, and delays were usual in the rainy season (December - April).

Rurrenbaque is at the base of Bolivia's Cordillera Real mountains, and there is mountainous terrain just south of the airport.

The Rurrenabaque non-directional beacon (Ident: RBQ) is located on the field.

Airlines and destinations

See also
Transport in Bolivia
List of airports in Bolivia

References

External links
Rurrenabaque Airport at OpenStreetMap
Rurrenabaque Airport at OurAirports

Rurrenabaque Airport at FallingRain

Airports in Beni Department